Paul Girodo (born August 6, 1973) is a former Canadian football defensive back who played three seasons in the Canadian Football League with the Winnipeg Blue Bombers and Saskatchewan Roughriders. He played CIS football for the UBC Thunderbirds of the University of British Columbia.

References

External links
Just Sports Stats

Living people
1973 births
Canadian football defensive backs
Canadian football slotbacks
UBC Thunderbirds football players
Winnipeg Blue Bombers players
Saskatchewan Roughriders players
Players of Canadian football from Ontario
Canadian football people from Ottawa